Jack Harrison LeVant (born October 3, 1999) is an American swimmer, currently attending Stanford University.

He participated at the 2019 World Aquatics Championships, swimming a leg of a preliminary heat for the USA men's 4×200-metre freestyle relay alongside Andrew Seliskar, Jack Conger, and Zach Apple; although LeVant did not swim in the final, he was awarded a bronze medal as the USA team finished third.

References

External links
 

1999 births
Living people
American male freestyle swimmers
World Aquatics Championships medalists in swimming